Szymon Sićko (born 20 August 1997) is a Polish handball player for Industria Kielce and the Polish national team.

Career
He made his debut for the national team on 8 June 2017, in a friendly match against Sweden (27:33). He threw his first goal on 28 December 2018, in a match against Japan (29:28).

He represented Poland at the 2020 European Men's Handball Championship.

References

External links

1997 births
Living people
Polish male handball players
Expatriate handball players
Polish expatriate sportspeople in Germany
Vive Kielce players
Handball-Bundesliga players
People from Sokółka County